Earl Haig Secondary School (EHSS), formerly Earl Haig Collegiate Institute is a public high school with  2,048 students in Toronto, Ontario, Canada. In addition to being a public secondary school, the school is also host to the Claude Watson Arts Program, an auditioned arts program integrated into the secondary school curriculum.

Opened in 1930 by the North York Board of Education, the school is named after Field Marshal The 1st Earl Haig, who was commander of the British Expeditionary Force during the majority of the First World War. The school was established in 1928, shortly after Earl Haig's death.

History

The original school was designed by the Toronto architectural firm of Craig and Madill and construction started in November 1929.  The building officially opened in 1930 as Earl Haig Collegiate Institute. Additions were made in the 1940s, 1950s and 1960s. In 1961, the school changed its name from Earl Haig Collegiate Institute to Earl Haig Secondary School. It is currently the largest high school in the Toronto District School Board and the oldest high school in the former City of North York.

The Claude Watson Arts Program began in 1982. The program consists of dance, drama, music, film arts, and visual arts.

In 1996, the original building was demolished in sections to make way for a new building. This new building was designed around the original auditorium, Cringan Hall. Carruthers Shaw and Partners Limited, the same company that designed buildings at Queen's University and Upper Canada College, designed the new building and Bondfield Construction were contracted to build the school. The new   building was officially opened in September 1997 at a cost of $30,800,000.

Claude Watson Arts Program

The Claude Watson Arts Program was founded in 1982 and is integrated with Earl Haig. A separate program from the open collegiate secondary school, enrolment in the Claude Watson program requires an audition and is available to Toronto students outside of Earl Haig's eligible attendance area. In addition to the secondary school there is Claude Watson School for the Arts for Grades 4 to 8. This elementary arts school operates on the site of the former Spring Gardens Public School property.

Each student takes a full academic course load and, additionally, majors in one of five arts disciplines: dance, drama, music, film arts or visual arts.

The curriculum of the Claude Watson Arts Program at Earl Haig Secondary School is similar to that of the arts-only school Etobicoke School of the Arts.

Wavy Hall

Wavy Hall is the name given to the glass hallway close to the main entrance of Earl Haig. The hallway was built as part of the school reconstruction in 1996. Wavy Hall is one of the most prominent architectural features of the school, and is the most immediately recognizable part of Earl Haig. It leads to Cringan Hall (the auditorium) and the music rooms.

See also
List of high schools in Ontario
List of Earl Haig Notable Alumni

References

External links
 Earl Haig SS Website
List of Earl Haig Notable Alumni

High schools in Toronto
Schools in the TDSB
Educational institutions established in 1929
1929 establishments in Ontario
Douglas Haig, 1st Earl Haig